The 1914 Michigan State Normal Normalites football team was an American football team that represented Michigan State Normal College (later renamed Eastern Michigan University) as an independent during the 1914 college football season.  In their first and only season under head coach Thomas Ransom, the Normalites compiled a 3–2–1 record  and outscored opponents by a total of 72 to 46. Fullback William A. Kishigo, an Ottawa Indian, was the team captain, but he was injured in the third game of the season, sustaining two broken ribs and a fractured shoulder.

Schedule

References

Michigan State Normal
Eastern Michigan Eagles football seasons
Michigan State Normal Normalites football